"Seven Doors Hotel", written by Joey Tempest, was the first single released from the Swedish heavy metal band Europe's self-titled debut album. It was a big hit in Japan, reaching the Top 10. It was one of the first songs he ever wrote.

Tempest was inspired to write the song after watching the Italian horror film The Beyond.

In 1985 Europe recorded a new version of the song, which was used as a B-side for the single "Rock the Night". Later the version was included in Rock Candy Records reissue of The Final Countdown.

Personnel

1983 version
Joey Tempest − vocals, keyboards
John Norum − guitars
John Levén − bass guitar
Tony Reno − drums

1985 version
Joey Tempest − vocals
John Norum − guitars
John Levén − bass guitar
Mic Michaeli − keyboards
Ian Haugland − drums

References 

1983 debut singles
1983 songs
1985 songs
Europe (band) songs
Victor Records singles
Songs written by Joey Tempest